The chocolate pipistrelle (Hypsugo affinis) is a species of vesper bat in the family Vespertilionidae. It is found in China, India, Myanmar, Nepal, and Sri Lanka.

Formerly classified in the genus Falsistrellus, phylogenetic evidence supports it belonging to the genus Hypsugo.

Description
Their hair is soft, dense, and relatively long. The dorsum is dark brown, but the extreme tips of the hairs are pale gray, giving a slightly grizzled appearance. The underside is lighter in color. The membrane, ears, and naked parts of the face are uniform blackish brown.

References

Hypsugo
Taxa named by George Edward Dobson
Mammals described in 1871
Bats of Asia
Bats of South Asia
Bats of Southeast Asia
Bats of India
Mammals of Myanmar
Mammals of China
Mammals of Nepal
Mammals of Sri Lanka
Taxonomy articles created by Polbot